Adrian Quist defeated Jack Crawford 6–2, 6–3, 4–6, 3–6, 9–7 in the final to win the men's singles tennis title at the 1936 Australian Championships.

Seeds
The seeded players are listed below. Adrian Quist is the champion; others show the round in which they were eliminated.

 Jack Crawford (finalist) /  Adrian Quist  (champion)
 n/a
 Vivian McGrath (quarterfinals)
 Don Turnbull (quarterfinals)
 John Bromwich (quarterfinals)
 Harry Hopman (semifinals)
 Abel Kay (semifinals)
 Len Schwartz (second round)

Draw

Key
 Q = Qualifier
 WC = Wild card
 LL = Lucky loser
 r = Retired

Earlier rounds

Section 1

Section 2

References

External links
 

1936 in Australian tennis
1936
Men's Singles